The 1962 Tour de Suisse was the 26th edition of the Tour de Suisse cycle race and was held from 14 June to 20 June 1962. The race started and finished in Zürich. The race was won by Hans Junkermann of the  team.

General classification

References

1962
Tour de Suisse